Blantyre Monument is a commemorative stone in Erskine, Renfrewshire. The monument is in the obelisk style. It is situated adjacent to the B815 road; in a field on the border  with Bishopton.

History
The monument was built to commemorate the bravery of Robert Walter Stuart, the 11th Lord Blantyre, who lived at nearby Erskine House (now Mar Hall). He was a Major-General in the British Army and served in the Napoleonic Wars with the Duke of Wellington.  He was killed accidentally by a stray bullet in a street fight in Brussels in 1830. The monument was planned by friends who held him in high esteem. William Burn was the designer. It was constructed in c.1825  and became a category B listed monument on 27 June 1980.

Inscription
The following passage is inscribed on the monument:

Erected by the county of Renfrew
to the memory of the right honorable
Robert Walter 11th Lord Blantyre

A Major-General in the British Army
and formerly Lord Lieutenant of
Renfrewshire

In testimony of respect for his
public services and as a tribute
of esteem of his private worth

See also
List of listed buildings in Erskine, Renfrewshire

References

Monuments and memorials in Scotland
Listed monuments and memorials in Scotland
British military memorials and cemeteries
Category B listed buildings in Renfrewshire
Obelisks in Scotland
Erskine, Renfrewshire